Kaizer Sebothelo Stadium is a multi-use stadium in Botshabelo, Free State, South Africa.  It is currently used mostly for football matches and is the home ground of FC Hunters. and Shamrock Flowers who plays in ABC Motsepe League.

Soccer venues in South Africa
Sports venues in the Free State (province)